was a Japanese molecular biologist.

Nomura was born in April 1927, a native of Hyōgo Prefecture, and completed a bachelor's degree and doctorate at the University of Tokyo. Nomura began work in 1957 as a postdoctoral researcher in the United States, alongside Sol Spiegelman, James Watson, and Seymour Benzer. Nomura returned to Japan in 1960, to teach at the Osaka University Institute of Protein Research. Three years later, Nomura accepted a position at the University of Wisconsin–Madison. He was named a full professor in 1966, and remained on the faculty until 1984, when he moved to the University of California, Irvine as Grace Bell Professor of Biological Chemistry. Awarded the NAS Award in Molecular Biology in 1971, Nomura gained membership into the National Academy of Sciences itself in 1978. He was also a member of the American Academy of Arts and Sciences, and the American Academy of Microbiology, as well as the Royal Netherlands Academy of Arts and Sciences and Danish Academy of Science. Nomura died in California on 19 November 2011, aged 84.

References

1927 births
2011 deaths
Japanese expatriates in the United States
Japanese molecular biologists
University of Tokyo alumni
Academic staff of Osaka University
University of California, Irvine faculty
University of Wisconsin–Madison faculty
Members of the United States National Academy of Sciences
Members of the Royal Danish Academy of Sciences and Letters
Members of the Royal Netherlands Academy of Arts and Sciences
Fellows of the American Academy of Arts and Sciences
20th-century Japanese scientists
20th-century biologists
People from Hyōgo Prefecture
Date of birth missing